Darul Uloom Haqqania or Jamia Dar al-Ulum Haqqania is an Islamic Seminary (darul uloom or madrasa) in the town of Akora Khattak, Khyber Pakhtunkhwa province, northwestern Pakistan. The seminary propagates the Hanafi Deobandi school of Sunni Islam. It was founded by Maulana Abdul Haq along the lines of the Darul Uloom Deoband seminary in India, where he had taught. It has been dubbed the "University of Jihad" due to its methods and content of instruction, along with the future occupations of its alumni. A number of leading members of the Taliban, including past chief Akhtar Mansour, studied here.

History
Maulana Abdul Haq (1912–1988) founded the institution on 23 September 1947. He was succeeded as chancellor by his son Sami-ul-Haq (1937–2018) of the Jamiat Ulema-e-Islam.

Chancellors

Maulana Abdul Haq
Abdul Haq (Urdu: عبدالحق, Pashto: عبدالحق; 11 January 1912 – 7 September 1988) of Akora Khattak, Pakistan, sometimes referred to as Abdul Haq Akorwi was a Pashtun Islamic scholar and the founder, chancellor, and Shaykh al-Hadith of the Islamic seminary Darul Uloom Haqqania. He has also served as vice-president of Wifaq ul Madaris Al-Arabia, Pakistan. He was involved in politics as a member of the political party Jamiat Ulema-e-Islam. He served three times in the National Assembly of Pakistan and was an active proponent of the Khatme Nabuwwat movement.

Abdul Haq completed his religious education at Darul Uloom Deoband in Deoband, India. He taught at Deoband for four years until difficulties arose due to the independence of Pakistan. In 1947, he founded Darul Uloom Haqqania in Akora Khattak, one of the first Islamic seminaries to be established in Pakistan. He taught hadith at the madrasah for the rest of his life and was well-known by the title "Shaykh al-Hadith".

Maulana Sami-ul-Haq
Maulana Sami-ul-Haq (1937–2018) or Maulana Sami-ul-Haq Haqqani (Samī'u’l-Ḥaq; 18 December 1937 – 2 November 2018) was a Pakistani religious scholar and senator. He was known as the Father of Taliban in Pakistan for the role his seminary Darul Uloom Haqqania played in the graduation of most Taliban leaders and commanders. With his party Jamiat Ulema-e-Islam (S), which split from Jamiat Ulema-e-Islam (F) because Haq supported Zia-ul-Haq and his policies, he was a member of the Senate of Pakistan from 1985 to 1991 and again from 1991 to 1997. After his assassination in 2018 his son Maulana Hamid Ul Haq Haqqani became the chancellor of the seminary and the ameer or head of the political party.

Career of Maulana Sami-ul-Haq
Maulana Sami-ul-Haq was regarded as the "Father of the Taliban" and had close ties to Taliban leader Mullah Mohammed Omar. Sami ul Haq was the chancellor of Darul Uloom Haqqania, a Deobandi Islamic seminary which is the alma mater of many prominent Taliban members. Haq served as chairman of the Difa-e-Pakistan Council and was the leader of his own faction of the Jamiat Ulema-e-Islam political party, known as JUI-S. Sami ul-Haq was also a founding member of a six-party religious alliance Muttahida Majlis-e-Amal ahead of 2002 general election.

He had also served as a member of the Senate of Pakistan. He formed Muttahida Deeni Mahaz (United Religious Front), an alliance of relatively small religio-political parties, to participate in the 2013 general election.

Haq stated that the US Ambassador to Pakistan, Richard G. Olson, visited him in July 2013 to discuss the situation of the region. Haq sympathized with the Taliban, stating: "Give them just one year and they will make the whole of Afghanistan happy. ... The whole of Afghanistan will be with them ... Once the Americans leave, all of this will happen within a year ... As long as they are there, Afghans will have to fight for their freedom," Haq said. "It's a war for freedom. It will not stop until outsiders leave."

In October 2018, an Afghan delegation comprising Ashraf Ghani government representatives and diplomats stationed in Pakistan, met Samiul Haq asking him to play a role in restoring peace in Afghanistan by bringing the Afghan Taliban back to the dialogue table.

Assassination of Maulana Sami-ul-Haq
On 2 November 2018, Sami-ul-Haq was assassinated at around 7:00 pm PST at his residence in Bahria Town, Rawalpindi. He was stabbed multiple times. He was taken to the nearby Safari Hospital where he was pronounced dead on arrival. The cause of his death was excessive blood loss due to the multiple stabbing across his body, including his face. According to his guard, he had intended to join the protests against the acquittal of Asia Bibi in Islamabad, but he could not join it due to road blockage.

Following the assassination, the Khyber Pakhtunkhwa government declared a day of mourning. Prime Minister Imran Khan condemned the murder saying "the country has suffered a great loss".

On 3 November 2018, he was buried in the premises of Darul Uloom Haqqania in his hometown of Akora Khattak in the afternoon. The funeral prayer was offered at the Khushal Khan Degree College and led by his son Hamid Ul Haq Haqqani. It was attended by a large number of political leaders and his followers. As part of the investigation into his murder, the police questioned his domestic staff.

Books of Maulana Sami-ul Haq
The editor-in-chief of the monthly journal Al-Haq until his death, he has been described as "a prolific Islamist writer" who "authored more than 20 books", some of his works including :
Islām aur ʻaṣr-i ḥāz̤ir, 1976. On Islam and the modern world, collected articles.
Qādiyān sey Isrāʼīl tak, 1978. Critical assessment of the Ahmadiyya movement. 
Kārvān-i āk̲h̲irat, 1990. Collection of condolence letters on the death of various South Asian religious scholars.
Ṣalibī dahshatgardī aur ʻālam-i Islām, 2004. Collection of interviews discussing Taliban movement, United States of America and West interests in Afghanistan.
Qādiyānī fitnah aur Millat-i Islāmiyah kā mauʼqqif, 2011. Criticism of the Ahmadiyya movement, co-authored with Maulana Muhammad Taqi Usmani.
K̲h̲ut̤bāt-i mashāhīr, 2015. Collected sermons on religious life in Islam, Islam and conduct of life and Islam and politics, in 10 volumes.
Afghan Taliban: War of Ideology : Struggle for Peace, 2015. His last notable book, on the peace process in Afghanistan.

Maulana Anwar-ul-Haq Haqqani
Maulana Anwar-ul-Haq Haqqani (2018–present) Maulana Anwar-ul-Haq Haqqani was a Pakistani Islamist Religious scholar and current chancellor of Darul Uloom Haqqania.
 
In 2018 Islamic Scholars in Akora Khattak Khyber Pakhtunkhwa Pakistan on Sunday named Maulana Anwar-ul-Haq Haqqani as new head of Darul Uloom Haqqania Akora Khattak after the assassination of his elder brother Maulana Sami-ul-Haq in Rawalpindi.The appointment was made after religious scholars unanimously agreed to appoint Maulana Anwaar, brother of assassinated Maulana Samiul Haq, as mohtamim (head) of the seminary during a dastarbandi.A large number of ulema and religious scholars including Maulana Ahmad Ludhianvi and Babar Awan were present on this occasion.The participants offered Fatiha after the dastarbandi ceremony and prayed for the departed soul. They also shed light on various aspects of Maulana Samiul Haq's life and paid tribute to his services he rendered for Pakistan and Religion.

Functioning and selection process
With a boarding school and a high school with thousands of students, as well as 12 affiliated smaller madrassas, offering an eight-year Master of Arts in Islamic studies followed by a PhD after two additional years, journalist Ahmed Rashid, who calls it the most popular madrassa in northern Pakistan, also notes its strict selection process : in February 1999, out of 15,000 applicants only 400 new places were offered, while there are reserved places for 400 Afghan students as well.

Notable people
The seminary is known for producing graduates who went on to become Islamist insurgents in Afghanistan, firstly mujahideen who fought against the Soviet Union in the Soviet–Afghan War, and later members of the Taliban, including senior leaders. 

Notable graduates include the following:
 Mohammad Yunus Khalis ( 1919–2006), important mujahideen commander
 Jalaluddin Haqqani (1939–2018), founding leader of the Haqqani network
 Akhtar Mansoor ( 1968–2016), former leader of the Taliban
 Sirajuddin Haqqani, minister of interior of the Islamic Emirate of Afghanistan
 Mullah Omar, founding leader of the Taliban, did not study there, but was granted an honorary doctorate

See also
 Madrassas in Pakistan
 Jamiat Ulema-e-Islam (S)
 Soviet–Afghan War

References

External links
 Education mullah style, Tony Cross, Radio France Internationale, 11 May 2008
 Pakistan: The Taliban takeover, Ziauddin Sardar, New Statesman, 30 April 2007
 Maulana Sami ul-Haq: Father of the Taliban, Center for Strategic and International Studies Post-Conflict Reconstruction Project, 27 Jan 2009

Islamic universities and colleges in Pakistan
Islamic schools in Pakistan
Universities and colleges in Khyber Pakhtunkhwa
Madrasas in Pakistan
Deobandi Islamic universities and colleges
Universities and colleges in Nowshera District
1947 establishments in Pakistan
Educational institutions established in 1947
Terrorism in Pakistan
Darul Uloom Haqqania